Alireza Jahanbakhsh Jirendeh (born 11 August 1993) is an Iranian professional footballer who plays as a winger and attacking midfielder for Eredivisie club Feyenoord and the Iran national team. He represented Iran at the 2014 FIFA World Cup, 2015 AFC Asian Cup, 2018 FIFA World Cup, 2019 AFC Asian Cup and the 2022 FIFA World Cup. Jahanbakhsh also represented Iran at the U20 and U23 levels.

In 2014 Jahanbakhsh was voted the second greatest young talent of the 2013–14 Eredivisie season. In the 2017–18 Eredivisie season, Jahanbakhsh scored 21 league goals, making him the first Asian player to become top scorer in a major European league.

Early life
Jahanbakhsh was born on 11 August 1993 in Jirandeh, a small city located in Rudbar County, Gilan Province. He grew up in Qazvin to Tat parents.

Club career

Damash
Jahanbakhsh played most of his youth in Rasht and Persian Qazvin before joining the youth academy of Damash Tehran in 2008. Jahanbaksh started his career in Tehran with Damash Tehran, an affiliate of Damash Gilan in the 2nd Division. In 2011, Jahanbakhsh returned to Gilan and at the age of 17. In 2011, Jahanbakhsh played his first game for Damash Gilan in the Iran Pro League against Mes as one of Damash's youngest ever players. Jahanbakhsh scored his first goal on 15 January 2012 in a 1–0 victory against Fajr. In 42 league appearances with Damash, he scored 10 goals.

NEC

2013–14 season
On 26 May 2013, Jahanbakhsh reached a verbal agreement with Dutch Eredivisie outfit NEC for a three-year deal. This deal was subject to a medical examination and obtaining a visa and work permit. He officially joined the club on 1 July 2013. He made his debut as a substitute in a league match against Groningen on 3 August 2013. He scored his first goal in an 8–0 win over Harkemase Boys in the KNVB Cup. On 1 December 2013, Jahanbakhsh scored two goals and assisted the other in a 3–2 league match win over AZ Alkmaar. On 22 December, he scored and assisted at FC Groningen while providing a secondary assist on 15 February 2014 against RKC Waalwijk. On 22 March, when NEC were down 2–0 at halftime, Jahanbakhsh came on as a substitute after the half and provided an assist to Michael Higdon in their 2–2 draw at Heerenveen.

On the final day of the 2013–14 season, Jahanbakhsh scored two late goals against Ajax to save NEC from automatic relegation, instead securing a relegation playoff spot. Jahanbakhsh was originally voted the Eredivisie's greatest talent of the season before becoming runner-up to Memphis Depay.

2014–15 season
On the opening day of the 2014–15 Jupiler League, Jahanbakhsh scored a goal in a 3–1 win against FC Eindhoven. On 29 August, he scored two goals and provided two assists in a 4–1 win at Helmond Sport. On 20 September, he scored against FC Emmen to help bring NEC to the top of the league table. Three days later, on 23 September, AJ scored a free kick in extra time and converted a penalty in their win against Ajax II at Amsterdam during the second round of the 2014–15 Dutch Cup. On 3 October, he scored a goal and provided an assist in a 2–1 win against Almere City to send NEC to the Eredivisie play-offs as quarter-season league champions. On 17 October 2014, Jahanbakhsh was named the Best Player of the First Period of the 2014–15 Jupiler League.

On 28 November, he opened the scoring with a volley and provided two assists in a 5–1 win over Jong Twente. On 1 February 2015, in his first game upon his return from the 2015 AFC Asian Cup, he scored a bicycle kick and was named man of the match in the 3–1 win over Helmond Sport. On 13 February, he scored a goal and provided two assists in a 3–2 win over FC Emmen with another goal against Achilles '29 days later to bring his tally to 4 goals in 5 consecutive matches after the Asian Cup.

At the end of the season, Jahanbakhsh was selected by fans as NEC's player of the season. On 12 May 2015 Jahanbakhsh was voted as the Eerste Divisie's best player for the 2014–15 season, with twelve goals and eighteen assists in the league.

AZ

2015–16 season
On 3 August 2015, Jahanbakhsh signed a five–year contract with Dutch club AZ Alkmaar. He was given number nine as his jersey number, and made his Eredivisie debut for AZ on 12 September 2015 in a 3–1 win over De Graafschap. Jahanbakhsh made his UEFA Europa League debut in a 2–1 group stage win over Athletic Bilbao on 1 October 2015. Jahanbakhsh recorded his first assist for AZ on 21 November 2015 in a 3–1 victory against Heerenveen. Jahanbakhsh scored his first goal for AZ on 30 January 2016 in a match against his former club NEC. He scored his second goal of the season and also recorded his fourth assist on 13 February 2016 in a 6–3 victory over Heracles Almelo.

2016–17 season
In June 2016 Jahanbakhsh switched from number 9 to number 7 for the upcoming 2016–17 season. On 2 July 2016, in AZ's first preseason match, Jahanbakhsh recorded a goal and an assist in his team's 5–1 victory. On 28 August he scored his first goal of the season against FC Utrecht. The match was ended 2-1 which Jahanbakhsh scored the winning goal.

On 13 January 2017, Jahanbakhsh scored a brace and recorded an assist, as well as being named man of the match in a 3–1 victory against Go Ahead Eagles. On 21 August 2016, he scored his first goal of the season in a 2–1 win over Utrecht. On 16 February 2017, he scored his first ever European goal in a 4–1 loss to Lyon in Round of 32 of the Europa League.

Jahanbakhsh was named the best winger of the 2016–17 season in the Dutch League.

2017–18 season
Jahanbakhsh scored a hat trick and recorded an assist on 18 April 2018 against Vitesse in the 2017–18 Eredivisie. Jahanbakhsh scored another hat trick on the last match day to become the leading goal scorer of the Eredivisie season with 21 goals, and also finished joint third with 12 assists. He became the first Asian player ever to become the top goalscorer in a top level European league.

Brighton & Hove Albion

2018–19 season

On 25 July 2018, Jahanbakhsh transferred to Premier League side Brighton & Hove Albion for an undisclosed club record fee, signing a five-year contract. He announced on his Instagram that he will wear number 16, the same number he used to wear in his first season at NEC.

On 11 August 2018, Jahanbakhsh made his debut for Brighton as a substitute in the club's opening match of the Premier League season against Watford. Even though he played 25 matches in the season due to injuries and poor performance he amounted no goals and no assists.

2019–20 season
With the managerial change at Brighton with Graham Potter replacing Chris Hughton, Jahanbakhsh rarely found himself in the match squad until 8 December 2019 when he came in as a substitute in a match against Wolverhampton. On 28 December 2019, he scored his first goal for the club on his first start against Bournemouth. Jahanbakhsh was overcome with emotion and was seen crying after scoring his first ever goal for his club. On 1 January 2020, he scored an equalising bicycle kick goal for Brighton against Chelsea. The goal against Chelsea was later voted by people as the Premier League Goal of the Month for January, in which Jahanbakhsh described it as the best goal he has ever scored.

2020–21 season

Jahanbakhsh came on as a sub in the Brighton's opening day of the season in a 3–1 home loss against Chelsea in the league. He scored a cracker in the next game, a 4–0 home thrashing over Portsmouth in the EFL Cup on 17 September. He scored again 6 days later again coming in the EFL Cup, this time a 2–0 away win over Preston. Jahanbakhsh started in Brighton's 3–2 home victory over champions Manchester City on 18 May 2021, with fans returning to football. Brighton came back from 2–0 down to secure their first win over The Sky Blues since 1989.

Feyenoord
On 17 July 2021, Feyenoord announced that Jahanbakhsh had joined the club on a 3-year contract with an option for a fourth year. He made his debut for Feyenoord on 29 July in the second leg of the UEFA Europa Conference League tie against FC Drita where he started the match but later substituted in the 3–2 home victory, with Feyenoord also going through 3–2 on aggregate. He scored his first two goals for the club on 12 August, scoring Feyenoord's first two goals in a 3–0 win against FC Luzern in the third qualifying round of the 2021–22 UEFA Europa Conference League. Jahanbakhsh made his league debut for the Rotterdam side on 22 August starting in the 2–0 home victory over Go Ahead Eagles.

International career

Youth
Jahanbakhsh was part of the squad that played at the 2010 AFC U-19 Championship in China, playing in two games. Being only 16 at the start of the championships in 2010, he continued at the same age group, captaining the national under-20 team for their successful 2012 AFC U-19 Championship qualification by scoring 5 goals in four appearances. At the championships, he added two more to his tally against the United Arab Emirates and South Korea.

Jahanbakhsh was called into Iran's Olympic qualifiers in March 2015 and was named team captain. With the presence of Jahanbakhsh the under-23 team qualified to the 2016 AFC U-23 Championship in Qatar. As the 2016 AFC U-23 Championship was not held during the FIFA International Match Calendar, Jahanbakhsh was not released by AZ Alkmaar.

Senior team
On 5 October 2013, Jahanbakhsh was called up to Team Melli in a 2015 Asian Cup qualifier against Thailand by manager Carlos Queiroz, and he served his first cap as a substitute in the 82nd minute. His first national team goal came in his second game on 15 November in a 3–0 win at Thailand. On 1 June 2014, he was called into Iran's 2014 FIFA World Cup squad by Carlos Queiroz. He played in all three matches against Nigeria, Argentina and Bosnia and Herzegovina. He was called into Iran's 2015 AFC Asian Cup squad on 30 December 2014 by Queiroz.

Jahanbakhsh scored Iran's second goal in June 2016 in a 2–0 World Cup qualifier victory against Qatar.

In May 2018, he was named in Iran's squad for the 2018 FIFA World Cup in Russia. He played all three group matches against Morocco, Spain and Portugal.

In December 2018, Jahanbakhsh was selected for Iran's 23-man squad for the 2019 AFC Asian Cup. On 16 January 2019, he made his competitive debut in a 0–0 draw against Iraq in the last match of the group stage. In the latter match, he scored his first goal in the tournament in the 2–0 victory against Oman.

Style of play
Jahanbakhsh has been compared to Iranian legend Mehdi Mahdavikia. In Holland, Jahanbakhsh established himself as a dangerous and pacy player.
In several interviews Jahanbakhsh revealed his life time dream is to play in Bundesliga, although there is huge interest in him from Italian and English sides declaring that as a kid he grew up watching his idols Ali Daei, Ali Karimi and Vahid Hashemian play for Bayern Munich and Mehdi Mahdavikia for Hamburger SV.

Outside football

Social media

In January 2020, Jahanbakhsh said that he posted on Instagram a photo of Iranian major general Qasem Soleimani, who was killed at the 2020 Baghdad International Airport airstrike, and that the post was taken down.

Sponsorship
Jahanbakhsh is outfitted by German sportswear manufacturer Adidas.

Career statistics

Club

International

Scores and results list Iran's goal tally first.

Honours

Club
NEC
Eerste Divisie: 2014–15

AZ
KNVB Cup runner-up: 2016–17, 2017–18

Feyenoord
 UEFA Europa Conference League runner-up: 2021–22

Individual
Eerste Divisie First Period Player of the Season: 2014–15
Eerste Divisie Best Player of the Season (Gouden Stier): 2014–15
Eredivisie top scorer: 2017–18 (21 goals)
Premier League Goal of the Month: January 2020
Feyenoord Goal of Season: 2021–22

See also
Iranians in the Netherlands

References

External links

Alireza Jahanbakhsh at PersianLeague.com
Voetbal International profile 

1993 births
Living people
People from Qazvin
Iranian footballers
Iran under-20 international footballers
Iran international footballers
Association football wingers
Damash Iranian players
Damash Gilan players
NEC Nijmegen players
AZ Alkmaar players
Brighton & Hove Albion F.C. players
Feyenoord players
Persian Gulf Pro League players
Eredivisie players
Eerste Divisie players
Premier League players
2014 FIFA World Cup players
2015 AFC Asian Cup players
2018 FIFA World Cup players
2019 AFC Asian Cup players
Iranian expatriate footballers
Expatriate footballers in England
Expatriate footballers in the Netherlands
Iranian expatriate sportspeople in England
Iranian expatriate sportspeople in the Netherlands
2022 FIFA World Cup players